Taragmarcha is a genus of moths in the family Oecophoridae. The species of this genus are found on the Indian Ocean islands of Mauritius and Réunion.

Species
Taragmarcha borbonensis Viette, 1957
Taragmarcha filicincta Meyrick, 1930
Taragmarcha glutinata Meyrick, 1930
Taragmarcha laqueata Meyrick, 1910

References
Meyrick, E. 1910a. Descriptions of Micro-Lepidoptera from Mauritius and Chagos Isles. - Transactions of the Entomological Society of London 1910(3):366–377.

Oecophoridae